Novosel is a Croatian surname. It is the one of the most common surnames in two counties of Croatia.

It may refer to:
 House of Novosel, Croatian nobility
 Andrija Novosel (born 1993), Slovenian footballer
 Natalie Novosel (born 1989), American basketball player
 Mirko Novosel (born 1938), Croatian basketball player
 Michael J. Novosel (1922–2006), American air force officer
 Steve Novosel (born 1940), American musician
 Viktorija Novosel (born 1989), Croatian singer

See also
 
 Novoselov, a Russian surname

References

Croatian surnames